Club San Patricio, or just San Patricio, is an Argentine rugby union and field hockey club, located in  Pilar, Buenos Aires Province. The club was founded on March 17, 1973, by a group of young enthusiasts with the purpose of practising amateur rugby. Luis Cacciabue was the first president of the institution. Women's field hockey would be later added as sport.
The rugby union team currently plays in Primera División A, the second division of the URBA league system.

References

External links
 

s
s
s
s